Henri-Michel Guedier de Saint-Aubin (June 17, 1695-Sept. 27, 1742) was a French theologian.

He was born at Gournay-en-Bray June 17, 1695. He studied at Paris, and received the doctor's degree from the Sorbonne Oct. 29,1723. He became professor in that institution in 1730, and its librarian in 1736. Some time after he obtained the abbey of St. Vulmer. He was acquainted with Hebrew, Greek, Latin, French, English, and Italian, besides history, theology, and kindred sciences. For fourteen years he decided all cases of conscience presented to the Sorbonne. He died at Paris Sept. 27, 1742.

He wrote, Histoire salute des deux Alliances (Paris, Didot, 1741, 7 vols. 12mo), which Moreri considers as a good concordance of the Old and New Testament. At the end of every part are remarks and arguments on the designs of the sacred writers, and on the authenticity and inspiration of their writings. — Ladvocat, Dict. historique; Moreri, Dict. hist. (edit. 1759); Hoefer, Nouv. Biog. Genesis 22:358.

French librarians
1695 births
1742 deaths